Labidodemas is a genus of marine sea cucumbers in the family Holothuriidae. The genus was erected by Emil Selenka in 1867.

Species
The World Register of Marine Species recognises the following species:
 Labidodemas americanum Deichmann, 1938
 Labidodemas maccullochi (Deichmann, 1958)
 Labidodemas pertinax (Ludwig, 1875)
 Labidodemas pseudosemperianum Massin, Samyn & Thandar, 2004
 Labidodemas quadripartitum Massin, Samyn & Thandar, 2004
 Labidodemas rugosum (Ludwig, 1875)
 Labidodemas semperianum Selenka, 1867
 Labidodemas spineum Massin, Samyn & Thandar, 2004

References

Holothuriidae
Holothuroidea genera